The Tempest is a 1998 American drama television film directed by Jack Bender. It is a modernized adaptation of the William Shakespeare play The Tempest set in Mississippi during the Civil War starring Peter Fonda as Gideon Prosper, a character based on Shakespeare's Prospero.

Plot
Gideon Prosper, a Southern slave-owner, is forced off his plantation by his younger brother Anthony before the outbreak of the Civil War. Surviving in the Mississippi bayou, Prosper uses magic that he learned from one of his slaves to protect his teenage daughter and to assist the Union.

Cast

 Peter Fonda as Gideon Prosper
 John Glover as Anthony Prosper
 Harold Perrineau as Ariel
 Katherine Heigl as Miranda Prosper
 John Pyper-Ferguson as Gator Man
 Eddie Mills as Captain Frederick Allen
 Dennis Redfield as Wilfried "Willy" Gonzo
 Donzaleigh Abernathy as Mambo Azaleigh
 Jon Huffman as General Grant
 Tom Nowicki as General Sherman
 Rhoda Griffis as Sophie Dupree
 Lonnie Hamilton as Old Ariel
 Rachel Crouch as Young Miranda
 Alex Van as Lead Raider
 Tim Parati as Raider
 Charles Lawlor as General Pemberton
 David Dwyer as Sheriff
 Rob Treveiler as Union Sentry
 Roby Pettit as Picket #2
 Maxwell Bruce as Bluecoat
 Bill Gribble as Scout
 James Bigwood as Lieutenant
 Steve Coulter as Lewis
 Ethan Jensen as Picket
 Dallas Miller as Field Slave
 Don Shanks as Overseer
 Gary Dow as Grant's Sergeant Major
 Rick Lundin as Possee Member
 Adrienne Reynolds as Delia
 John Laporte as Surgeon
 Patricia Buckley-Moss as Dancer
 Mark Miller as Union Soldier
 Diedra Orhant (stand-in for Katherine Heigl)
 Johnny W. Wilbans as 2nd Union Sentry

Production
Filming took place at Cypress Gardens, and other locations in, and around,  Charleston, South Carolina.

Broadcast
The film was broadcast on NBC at 9:00 p.m. Eastern Time on Sunday, December 13, 1998.

Reception
In his 2001 book Shakespeare in the Movies: From the Silent Era to Today, author Douglas Brode wrote that "Jack Bender's film emerged as yet another offbeat variation on Will's theme, but with the Bard's immortal poetry entirely excised."

In a negative review for the Los Angeles Times, reviewer Daryl H. Miller wrote, "A miscalculation of epic proportions, this revision of one of the Bard’s masterworks is at times laugh-out-loud awful, at times offensive."

In a negative review for People, reviewer Terry Kelleher wrote, "The low-key style that served Fonda so well in his Oscar-nominated Ulee’s Gold role doesn’t work for Prosper/Prospero, who needs a charisma that the actor can’t provide. The script gives Fonda two lines of actual Shakespeare at the end, and we admit he seems less than comfortable with the language."

In a review for Variety, reviewer Laura Fries wrote, "What makes this production universally appealing is that it lacks the pretenses that usually come with a literary-based telepic. Writer James Henerson plays on such ’90s issues as lost faith, selfishness, vengeance and loyalty to propel this Civil War-era saga."

See also
 List of William Shakespeare film adaptations

References

External links
 

1998 films
1998 television films
1998 drama films
American Civil War films
American fantasy films
American films based on plays
American drama television films
Fantasy television films
Films based on The Tempest
Films directed by Jack Bender
Films scored by Terence Blanchard
Films set in 1851
Films set in 1863
Films set in Mississippi
Films shot in South Carolina
Modern adaptations of works by William Shakespeare
1990s English-language films
1990s American films